Johannes's tody-tyrant (Hemitriccus iohannis) is a species of bird in the family Tyrannidae. It is found in Bolivia, Brazil, Colombia, Ecuador, and Peru. Its natural habitats are subtropical or tropical moist lowland forests and heavily degraded former forest.

References

Johannes's tody-tyrant
Birds of the Brazilian Amazon
Birds of the Bolivian Amazon
Birds of the Ecuadorian Amazon
Birds of the Peruvian Amazon
Johannes's tody-tyrant
Johannes's tody-tyrant
Taxonomy articles created by Polbot